"Drugs" is a song by American rock band Falling in Reverse featuring American singer and composer Corey Taylor. It was released on April 8, 2019, through Epitaph Records. This is the band's third single without an album being announced, and is the culmination of the saga of the songs "Losing My Mind" and "Losing My Life". The song was produced by DangerKids vocalist Tyler Smyth and vocalist Ronnie Radke. The song also features Black Veil Brides drummer Christian "CC" Coma.

Promotion and release
In March 2019, the members of the band uploaded a photo on their social networks which would be the cover of the new song. Finally on April 8, 2019, the new single "Drugs" would come out surprisingly, this song would have the collaboration of the vocalist of the bands Slipknot and Stone Sour, Corey Taylor. In addition to the participation of the Black Veil Brides drummer Christan "CC" Coma. This after drummer Brandon "Rage" Richter left the band in mid-2018, since then the band has been playing with touring drummer Anthony Ghazel.

This song marks the departure of keyboardist and guitarist Zakk Sandler as he was not seen in the music video. The band announced the "Episode III Tour" as the headlining band, alongside bands such as Ice Nine Kills, New Year's Day and From Ashes to New, as well as CC's participation in the tour.

Composition and lyrics
The song was composed by Ronnie Radke and written by himself and musicians/producers Charles Kallaghan Massabo and Wage War guitarist Cody Quistad. To begin with, Falling in Reverse's "Drugs" definitely has a hostile tone. And death – whether symbolic or literal – is one of its major themes. However, there is clearly an underlying, philosophical message behind the song. In other words, while the title of the track is “Drugs”, these substances in and of themselves are dealt with relatively-briefly. In the song Ronnie tries to explain how difficult it is to live trying to meet the expectations of others and society in general.

Corey Taylor's part is the heaviest part of the song since Corey singing with gutturals sounds more like his voice in Slipknot than his voice in Stone Sour.

Music video
The music video for the song was directed by Ethan Lader, the video shows Ronnie Radke continuing the battle against his other self. However, this time he fights against the Ronnie who was the protagonist of the music video for "Losing My Life", the video again has the participation of his daughter Willow Radke. The music video has more than 30 million views on YouTube.

Track listing
The track listing provided from the EP Drugs only released on Spotify.

Personnel
Falling in Reverse
 Ronnie Radke – vocals, keyboards, composer, producer
 Derek Jones – rhythm guitar, backing vocals
 Max Georgiev – lead guitar, backing vocals
 Tyler Burgess – bass guitar, backing vocals
Additional musicians
 Corey Taylor – vocals
 Christian "CC" Coma – drums
 Tyler Smyth – producer, keyboards, synth, drum pad
 Charles Kallaghan Massabo – composer, engineer, beat
 Cody Quistad – composer, guitar

Charts

References

2019 singles
2019 songs
Falling in Reverse songs
Corey Taylor songs
Songs written by Ronnie Radke
Epitaph Records singles